K131 or K-131 may refer to:

K-131 (Kansas highway), a state highway in Kansas
Soviet submarine K-131, a submarine